OFK SIM Raslavice is a Slovak football team, based in the town of Raslavice.

Current squad

Colours
Club colours are red and white.

External links
Club website 
Soccerway profile 
  
Club profile at Futbalnet.sk

References

Football clubs in Slovakia
Association football clubs established in 1930